is a Japanese figure skater who is now a coach and figure skating commentator. He is a three-time Japanese national champion. He placed 25th in the 1968 Winter Olympic Games, and 16th in the 1972 Winter Olympic Games.

Competitive highlights

See also 
Figure skating at the 1968 Winter Olympics
Figure skating at the 1972 Winter Olympics

External links
Japan Figure Skating Instructor Association

1949 births
Living people
Japanese male single skaters
Olympic figure skaters of Japan
Figure skaters at the 1960 Winter Olympics
Figure skaters at the 1964 Winter Olympics